Richard Henry Kroft,  (born May 22, 1938) is a former Canadian lawyer, businessman, and Senator.

Born in Winnipeg, Manitoba, he received a Bachelor of Arts in Economics and Political Science from the University of Manitoba in 1959 and an LL.B in 1963.

He was Assistant Secretary and Treasurer of McCabe Grain Co. Ltd. Next, he became Special Assistant to the Minister of Finance, and Executive Assistant to the Secretary of State for External Affairs, Mitchell Sharp. After, in 1969, he became President of Tryton Investment Co. Ltd.

He was summoned to the Senate by recommendation of Jean Chrétien in 1998, and resigned in 2004. He was Chair of the Standing Committee on Internal Economy, Budgets and Administration, and Chair of the Standing Senate Committee on Banking, Trade and Commerce.

He is married to Hillaine Jacob and has three children, Elizabeth, Steven, and Gordon.

Honours
In 1997, he was made a Member of the Order of Canada. In 2008, he was awarded an honorary Doctor of Laws degree from the University of Manitoba.

References

External links
 

1938 births
Living people
Businesspeople from Winnipeg
Canadian senators from Manitoba
Jewish Canadian politicians
Lawyers in Manitoba
Liberal Party of Canada senators
Members of the Order of Canada
Politicians from Winnipeg
Robson Hall alumni
University of Manitoba alumni
21st-century Canadian politicians